Surviving Paradise is a 2001 American family adventure/drama film written and directed by Kamshad Kooshan. With three months of theatrical release in major theaters in Southern California and the San Francisco Bay Area, it is considered to be the first English-language Iranian-American film distributed in the United States. This film is believed to be one of the first vehicles in introducing Shohreh Aghdashloo to Hollywood.

The story concerns the struggles of a newly-arrived Iranian brother and sister in the rough as well as better-off neighborhoods of Los Angeles.

Plot
When the 10-year-old boy Sam and his younger sister Sara arrived in Los Angeles with their mother, the only thing on their mind was to go to Disneyland. But things take a wrong turn when their mother is kidnapped by three armed members of the mafia. Realizing that the police can't find their uncle, their only relative in town at the time, these two helpless children take on the vast and unforgiving streets of Los Angeles to find him themselves. On their way they encounter a colorful cast of characters and frightening situations where their humanity and endurance are tested.

Cast
Shohreh Aghdashloo as Pari
Kian Abedini as Sam
Lauren Parissa Abedini as Sara
Joe Alvarez as Mr. F
David Jay Barry as Mr. A
David Wissak as Mr. Z
Otis Freeman as Lou
Vahik Pirhamzei as Mo

Critical reception
Kevin Thomas of the Los Angeles Times called the film "well-intended but awkward." Mick LaSalle also panned Surviving Paradise in the San Francisco Chronicle, describing the film as exemplifying the worst aspects of both American and Iranian cinema, and calling it a "low-budget mess," "poorly made," "aimless," and "overly sentimental." In the LA Weekly, Professor of Cinematic Arts Holly Willis called it "laughable," writing that it "proffers an astonishing array of cultural clichés in a flat-footed story."

Awards and festivals 
New York International Independent Film Festival (2001)
Sundance Screenwriter's Lab, semi-finalist 1997
Cairo International Film Festival (2000)
International Film Festival of India (2000)
San Francisco Parent/Teacher Association

References

External links
 
Official Movie Site
Surviving Paradise on IFVC

2001 films
American drama films
Films set in the 1990s
Films set in Los Angeles
2001 directorial debut films
Asian-American drama films
Iranian-American films
2000s English-language films
2000s American films